Jānis Kalējs (born 1965 in Riga) is a Latvian film director. Kalējs was one of four contributing directors awarded the Lielais Kristaps Best Film award in 2007 for the film Vogelfrei.

References

1965 births
Latvian film directors
Lielais Kristaps Award winners
Living people